Rafik Deghiche (born October 1, 1983 in Zeralda (Alger), Algeria) is an Algerian footballer. He currently plays as a forward for USM Alger in the Algerian league.

Rafik's brother Mesbah Deghiche is also a footballer and plays for JSM Béjaïa.

Club career
 1993-1997 CA Kouba (Juniors) 
 1997-2002 USM Alger (Juniors) 
 2002-2005 USM Alger 
 2005-2008 JSM Béjaïa 
 2008-2008 WA Tlemcen 
 2008-pres. USM Alger

External links
 DZFoot Profile

1983 births
Algerian footballers
Living people
Footballers from Algiers
USM Alger players
JSM Béjaïa players
WA Tlemcen players
Algeria youth international footballers
Association football forwards
21st-century Algerian people
20th-century Algerian people